Tai Pak Tin East is one of the 31 constituencies in the Kwai Tsing District of Hong Kong.

Created for the 2019 District Council elections, the constituency sends one district councillor to the Kwai Tsing District Council, with an election every four years.

Tai Pak Tin East loosely covers area surrounding Shek Lei (II) Estate in Kwai Chung. It has an estimated population of 16,560.

Councillors represented

Election results

2010s

References

Kwai Chung
Constituencies of Hong Kong
Constituencies of Kwai Tsing District Council
2019 establishments in Hong Kong
Constituencies established in 2019